Elaan-E-Jung  is a 1989 Bollywood action film directed by Anil Sharma and starring Dharmendra and Jaya Prada. The movie colected 11 crores and was a box office success. The film had Sadashiv Amrapurkar as the main villain.

Plot 
A small Indian village is terrorized by a terrorist Kalanag who wants to destroy the country and become its ruler.

Cast

Music 
"Doston Se Dosti Dushmano Se Dushmani v1" – Mohammed Aziz, Anuradha Paudwal
"Doston Se Dosti Dushmano Se Dushmani v2" – Anuradha Paudwal, Nitin Mukesh
"Doston Se Dosti Dushmano Se Dushmani v3" – Mohammed Aziz
"Doston Se Dosti Dushmano Se Dushmani v4" – Mohammed Aziz
"Jaan Vatan Ko Denge" – Mohammed Aziz
"Mera Naam Hai Badnaam Ho Gaya" – Alka Yagnik
"Mera Naam Reema Hai" – Alka Yagnik & Shabbir Kumar
"Tik Tik Tik Tik Chalti Hai Ghadi" – Anuradha Paudwal

References

External links 
 

1989 films
1980s Hindi-language films
Films scored by Laxmikant–Pyarelal
Films directed by Anil Sharma
Indian action films